Magnapinna'' sp. B is an undescribed species of bigfin squid known only from a single immature specimen collected in the northern Atlantic Ocean. 
Description
It is characterised by its dark epidermal pigmentation, which is epithelial, as opposed to the chromatophoral pigmentation found in other  Magnapinna species.
Discovery
The only known specimen of Magnapinna sp. B is a juvenile male of  mantle length (ML) held in the Bergen Museum.

References
Vecchione, M. & Young, R. E. (2006). "The squid family Magnapinnidae (Mollusca; Cephalopoda) in the North Atlantic with a description of Magnapinna atlantica, n. sp.". Proc. Biol. Soc. Wash.'' 119(3): 365-372.

External links
Tree of Life web project: Magnapinna sp. B

Squid
Undescribed mollusc species
Species known from a single specimen